Greatest Hits is the first compilation album by American R&B and pop singer-songwriter Sybil, released in 1997.

Critical reception
British magazine Music Week rated the compilation four out of five, writing, "The New Jersey soul singer's superb voice – and ability to tackle a variety of material – is showcased on this fine 19-track collection, which includes her 12 hits from the past decade."

Track listing

Greatest Hits (US edition)
"Don't Make Me Over" (Tony King Remix) – 3:54
"Walk On By" (Tony King Remix) – 4:04
"Love's Calling" – 3:40
"You're the Love of My Life" (Desmond 'Divine' Houston Remix) – 4:50
"Falling in Love" – 5:00
"Let Yourself Go" – 5:29
"My Love Is Guaranteed" (Prophets Of Rage Remix) – 3:53
"Oh, How I Love You" (Victor Simonelli Remix) – 3:53
"The Love I Lost" (AKA Remix) – 3:24
"When I'm Good and Ready" (Stratoradio Remix) – 3:50
"Open Up the Door" (Eddie O'Loughlin Remix) – 5:04
"Crazy for You" (featuring Salt-N-Pepa) – 4:27
"Let It Rain" (D'Anthony's Moody Vibe Remix) – 5:57

Greatest Hits (Europe edition)
"When I'm Good and Ready" (Original) – 3:34
"The Love I Lost" – 3:25
"Don't Make Me Over" – 4:03
"Walk On By" – 4:08
"Make It Easy on Me" – 4:03
"Beyond Your Wildest Dreams" (Johnny's Jumpin' Vibe Remix) – 3:11
"Falling in Love" – 4:23
"Let Yourself Go" – 5:43
"My Love Is Guaranteed" (Remix) – 3:58
"Oh, How I Love You" (Remix) – 3:55
"You're the Love of My Life" (Remix) – 4:53
"Love's Calling" – 3:45
"Open Up the Door" – 5:09
"Crazy for You" (featuring Salt-N-Pepa) – 4:29
"Let It Rain" (D'Anthony's Moody Vibe Remix) – 6:00
"Guarantee of Love" – 4:02
"Stronger Together" – 3:30
"Didn't See the Signs" – 3:07
"When I'm Good and Ready" (Stratoradio Remix) – 3:50

Sources
 Discogs

References

1997 compilation albums
Sybil (singer) albums